Parque is the Galician, Portuguese and Spanish word for "park", and may refer to: 

 Parque (TransMilenio), a metro station in Bogotá, Colombia
 Parque (Lisbon Metro), in Portugal
 Parque (Santurce), a subbarrio in San Juan, Puerto Rico
 Jim Parque, a baseball player

See also 
 Parquetry, a type of flooring
 Park (disambiguation)